David John Mellor  (born 12 March 1949) is a British broadcaster, barrister, and former politician. As a member of the Conservative Party, he served in the Cabinet of Prime Minister John Major as Chief Secretary to the Treasury (1990–1992) and Secretary of State for National Heritage (April–September 1992), before resigning in 1992. He was the Member of Parliament (MP) for Putney from 1979 to 1997.

Since leaving Parliament, Mellor has worked as a newspaper columnist, a radio presenter, and an after-dinner speaker. He also served as Chairman of the government's 'Football Task Force'.

Education and early career
Born in Wareham, Dorset, Mellor was educated at Swanage Grammar School, and Christ's College, Cambridge, during which time he was Chairman of the Cambridge University Conservative Association and a contestant on University Challenge. After briefly working for Jeffrey Archer (at the time a Member of Parliament) while studying for his bar exams, Mellor was called to the Bar in 1972. He ceased to practise in 1979 upon being elected as an MP, and he remains "non-practising". He was appointed Queen's Counsel in 1987.

Parliamentary career
After contesting West Bromwich East in the general election in October 1974, Mellor became the MP for Putney in the general election of 1979, and held the seat until 1997.

Government minister
Mellor was made Parliamentary Under-Secretary of State at the Department of Energy in 1981.

In 1983, Mellor was appointed as a minister in the Home Office where he was involved in several pieces of legislation, including the Police and Criminal Evidence Act 1984 and the Prosecution of Offences Act 1985 (which established the Crown Prosecution Service). He was also involved with legislation enabling the re-investigation of miscarriages of justice, and with the Animals (Scientific Procedures) Act 1986.

In 1987, Mellor was moved to the Foreign, Commonwealth and Development Office by Thatcher, and was made responsible for the Middle East, Eastern Europe, and the Soviet Union (before the revolutions of 1989). At this point he made an extended appearance on the Channel 4 discussion programme After Dark speaking about the Mafia.

Mellor was briefly Secretary of State for Health and Social Care in 1988, where he was responsible for health service reforms. He was made a Privy Councillor in 1990 by Thatcher, shortly before she resigned as Prime Minister.

Mellor was briefly Minister for the Arts in 1990 before entering John Major's new Cabinet as Chief Secretary to the Treasury in November of that year. He was interviewed in December 1991 on the TV programmne Hard News following the establishment of the Calcutt Review inquiring into Press Standards. Mellor said during the interview that "the press – the popular press – is drinking in the last chance saloon" and called for curbs on the "sacred cow" of press freedom to curb their more extreme activities.

Following the 1992 general election Mellor remained a Cabinet Minister as Secretary of State for Culture, Media and Sport in the newly created Department of National Heritage (now the Department for Digital, Culture, Media and Sport), during which period he was occasionally referred to as the "Minister for Fun" after comments he made to the waiting press on leaving 10 Downing Street on his appointment.

Resignation
In July 1992 Mellor's former mistress, actress Antonia de Sancha, sold her "kiss and tell" story of Mellor's extra-marital affair with her for £35,000. Their telephone conversations had been secretly recorded by de Sancha's landlord, an activity which at the time was legal in England. The Sun, relying on material supplied by the publicist Max Clifford, made a number of untrue claims about the relationship, that de Sancha later admitted. This was subsequently confirmed by David Mellor in 2011 at the Leveson Inquiry into Press Behaviour.

The Prime Minister John Major supported Mellor, but the media maintained their interest. A libel case brought by Mona Bauwens against  The People, which came to the High Court in September 1992, led to the revelation that Mellor had accepted the gift of a month-long holiday in Marbella from Bauwens for his family which took place in August 1990. Mellor's connection to Bauwens, the daughter of Jaweed al-Ghussein, the finance director of the PLO (formally the Palestine National Fund) maintained the pressure on him. Mellor resigned on 24 September 1992.

Defeat at 1997 general election
Mellor contested the 1997 general election, but was defeated by the Labour Party's Tony Colman as one of the most notable Tory casualties as Labour won by a landslide to end nearly 20 years of Conservative government. The election night was memorable for Mellor's showdown with the Referendum Party founder Sir James Goldsmith: Mellor was taunted by Goldsmith and Michael Yardley, the Spokesperson for the Sportsman's Alliance (who gave him a slow hand clap and shouted "Out! Out! Out!") during Mellor's concession speech. Mellor retorted:

Goldsmith would die from pancreatic cancer two months later on 18 July 1997.

After Parliament
Mellor was chairman of the incoming Labour government's 'Football Task Force' from August 1997 until its dissolution in 1999. Among the recommendations accepted by the Labour government and introduced into law was the criminalisation of racial abuse by an individual spectator, as distinct from a group.

Mellor has also pursued a career in journalism, and has written columns for six national newspapers including the Evening Standard, The Guardian and The People, often on current affairs, but also his specialist interests of sport and the arts. He regularly presented football-related programmes on BBC Radio 5 until 2001, and classical music programmes on BBC Radio 2 and BBC Radio 3 for six years.

Since 2000, Mellor has also been a radio presenter at Classic FM. He is an opera and classical music critic for the newspaper The Mail on Sunday. He is a regular contributor to the radio station LBC, on which he previously co-hosted a Saturday morning politics and current affairs discussion programme for eight years with former London Mayor Ken Livingstone. This continued until 2016, when Livingstone was sacked and Mellor's contract was not renewed.

In June 2010, it was reported in The Daily Telegraph and the Daily Mirror that Mellor called a chef a "fat bastard" during a licensing wrangle at the River Lounge restaurant near his home at St Katharine Docks, East London. The articles claimed Mellor used bad language and told the chef he should "do his £10-an-hour job somewhere else".

In November 2014 The Daily Telegraph and The Independent reported that Mellor had been secretly recorded by a taxi driver, saying "you think that your experiences are anything compared to mine?" In the secret recording of an encounter on 21 November, Mellor and the cab driver argue over which is the better route to their destination. The article alleged that he swore at the driver. Mellor later told the media that he regretted losing his temper but blamed the driver for provoking him.

Private life
Mellor married Judith Hall in Worthing on 20 July 1974. The couple had two sons before divorcing in 1995.

Mellor currently lives with his partner, Penelope Lyttelton, Viscountess Cobham.

References

External links

 
 
 Profile at Speakers International
 David Mellor on Classic FM
 David Mellor (Rt. Hon. David Mellor QC)  – Broadcaster, Journalist and Former MP (agent's site)
 

|-

|-

|-

1949 births
Living people
Alumni of Christ's College, Cambridge
British broadcaster-politicians
British Secretaries of State
Classical music radio presenters
Conservative Party (UK) MPs for English constituencies
English radio personalities
English King's Counsel
Members of the Privy Council of the United Kingdom
UK MPs 1979–1983
UK MPs 1983–1987
UK MPs 1987–1992
UK MPs 1992–1997
People educated at Swanage Grammar School
People from Wareham, Dorset
Contestants on University Challenge
Chief Secretaries to the Treasury